Laurence George South (February 26, 1925 – October 28, 2022) was a Canadian politician in Ontario. He served as a Liberal member of the Legislative Assembly of Ontario from 1985 to 1990.

Background
South grew up in Toronto's East End. After serving in the army at the end of WWII, he was educated at the University of Toronto, received Bachelor of Science and Master of Science degrees. He worked as an engineer with the Ontario Water Resources Commission (later, Ministry of the Environment) in Toronto and then Kingston. On retirement, South entered political life.

Politics
South was elected to the Ontario legislature in the 1985 provincial election, defeating Progressive Conservative incumbent J. Earl McEwen by about 2,500 votes in the eastern Ontario riding of Frontenac—Addington.  He was re-elected by a greater margin in the 1987 election, but lost to Fred Wilson of the NDP by 1,400 votes in the 1990 election.  He was a backbench supporter of David Peterson's government during his time in the legislature, and served as a parliamentary assistant in 1987 and 1988–1989. He was an opponent of nuclear energy during his time in office.

Personal life and death
South died at his home near Gananoque, Ontario, on October 28, 2022, at the age of 97.

References

External links
 

1925 births
2022 deaths
Canadian Army personnel of World War II
Ontario Liberal Party MPPs